Mona de Momma (foaled March 16, 2006) is an American Thoroughbred racehorse.

She is a Speightstown filly out of the Linkage mare Society Gal, a half sister to Grade 3 winner and sire Mr. Greenly. Owned by Michael Talla and trained by John W. Sadler, in 2010 burst onto the spotlight when she won the Las Flores Handicap, then she defeated  2009 Eclipse Champion Sprint Mare Informed Decision in the Humana Distaff Stakes on the Kentucky Derby undercard.

References
 Mona de Momma's pedigree and racing stats

2006 racehorse births
Thoroughbred family 22-b
Racehorses bred in Kentucky
Racehorses trained in the United Kingdom